The Ministry of Transport is a ministry of Latvia which is responsible for implementing state policy in the fields of transport and communications. Its head office is in Riga. As of 2022, Jānis Vitenbergs is the minister.

Subordinate agencies
 Latvian Civil Aviation Agency
 Maritime Administration of Latvia
 Transport Accident and Incident Investigation Bureau

References

External links

 Ministry of Transport
 Ministry of Transport 

Government of Latvia
Transport in Latvia